adopted by British military intelligence in June 1941 for wartime signals intelligence obtained by breaking high-level encrypted enemy radio and teleprinter communications at the Government Code and Cypher School (GC&CS) at Bletchley Park. Ultra eventually became the standard designation among the western Allies for all such intelligence. The name arose because the intelligence obtained was considered more important than that designated by the highest British security classification then used (Most Secret) and so was regarded as being Ultra Secret. Several other cryptonyms had been used for such intelligence.

The code name Boniface was used as a cover name for Ultra. In order to ensure that the successful code-breaking did not become apparent to the Germans, British intelligence created a fictional MI6 master spy, Boniface, who controlled a fictional series of agents throughout Germany. Information obtained through code-breaking was often attributed to the human intelligence from the Boniface network. The U.S. used the codename Magic for its decrypts from Japanese sources, including the "Purple" cipher.

Much of the German cipher traffic was encrypted on the Enigma machine. Used properly, the German military Enigma would have been virtually unbreakable; in practice, shortcomings in operation allowed it to be broken. The term "Ultra" has often been used almost synonymously with "Enigma decrypts". However, Ultra also encompassed decrypts of the German Lorenz SZ 40/42 machines that were used by the German High Command, and the Hagelin machine.

Many observers, at the time and later, regarded Ultra as immensely valuable to the Allies. Winston Churchill was reported to have told King George VI, when presenting to him Stewart Menzies (head of the Secret Intelligence Service and the person who controlled distribution of Ultra decrypts to the government): "It is thanks to the secret weapon of General Menzies, put into use on all the fronts, that we won the war!" F. W. Winterbotham quoted the western Supreme Allied Commander, Dwight D. Eisenhower, at war's end describing Ultra as having been "decisive" to Allied victory. Sir Harry Hinsley, Bletchley Park veteran and official historian of British Intelligence in World War II, made a similar assessment of Ultra, saying that while the Allies would have won the war without it, "the war would have been something like two years longer, perhaps three years longer, possibly four years longer than it was." However, Hinsley and others have emphasized the difficulties of counterfactual history in attempting such conclusions, and some historians, such as Keegan, have said the shortening might have been as little as the three months it took the United States to deploy the atomic bomb.

The existence of Ultra was kept secret for many years after the war.  Since the Ultra story was widely disseminated by Winterbotham in 1974, historians have altered the historiography of World War II. For example, Andrew Roberts, writing in the 21st century, states, "Because he had the invaluable advantage of being able to read Field Marshal Erwin Rommel's Enigma communications, General Bernard Montgomery knew how short the Germans were of men, ammunition, food and above all fuel. When he put Rommel's picture up in his caravan he wanted to be seen to be almost reading his opponent's mind. In fact he was reading his mail."  Over time, Ultra has become embedded in the public consciousness and Bletchley Park has become a significant visitor attraction.  As stated by historian Thomas Haigh, "The British code-breaking effort of the Second World War, formerly secret, is now one of the most celebrated aspects of modern British history, an inspiring story in which a free society mobilized its intellectual resources against a terrible enemy."

Sources of intelligence
Most Ultra intelligence was derived from reading radio messages that had been encrypted with cipher machines, complemented by material from radio communications using traffic analysis and direction finding. In the early phases of the war, particularly during the eight-month Phoney War, the Germans could transmit most of their messages using land lines and so had no need to use radio. This meant that those at Bletchley Park had some time to build up experience of collecting and starting to decrypt messages on the various radio networks. German Enigma messages were the main source, with those of the Luftwaffe predominating, as they used radio more and their operators were particularly ill-disciplined.

German

Enigma

"Enigma" refers to a family of electro-mechanical rotor cipher machines. These produced a polyalphabetic substitution cipher and were widely thought to be unbreakable in the 1920s, when a variant of the commercial Model D was first used by the Reichswehr. The German Army, Navy, Air Force, Nazi party, Gestapo and German diplomats used Enigma machines in several variants. Abwehr  (German military intelligence) used a four-rotor machine without a plugboard and Naval Enigma used different key management from that of the army or air force, making its traffic far more difficult to cryptanalyse; each variant required different cryptanalytic treatment. The commercial versions were not as secure and Dilly Knox of GC&CS is said to have broken one before the war.

German military Enigma was first broken in December 1932 by the Polish Cipher Bureau, using a combination of brilliant mathematics, the services of a spy in the German office responsible for administering encrypted communications, and good luck. The Poles read Enigma to the outbreak of World War II and beyond, in France. At the turn of 1939, the Germans made the systems ten times more complex, which required a tenfold increase in Polish decryption equipment, which they could not meet. On 25 July 1939, the Polish Cipher Bureau handed reconstructed Enigma machines and their techniques for decrypting ciphers to the French and British. Gordon Welchman wrote,

At Bletchley Park, some of the key people responsible for success against Enigma included mathematicians Alan Turing and Hugh Alexander and, at the British Tabulating Machine Company, chief engineer Harold Keen.
After the war, interrogation of German cryptographic personnel led to the conclusion that German cryptanalysts understood that cryptanalytic attacks against Enigma were possible but were thought to require impracticable amounts of effort and investment. The Poles' early start at breaking Enigma and the continuity of their success gave the Allies an advantage when World War II began.

Lorenz cipher

In June 1941, the Germans started to introduce on-line stream cipher teleprinter systems for strategic point-to-point radio links, to which the British gave the code-name Fish. Several systems were used, principally the Lorenz SZ 40/42 (Tunny) and Geheimfernschreiber (Sturgeon). These cipher systems were cryptanalysed, particularly Tunny, which the British thoroughly penetrated. It was eventually attacked using Colossus machines, which were the first digital programme-controlled electronic computers. In many respects the Tunny work was more difficult than for the Enigma, since the British codebreakers had no knowledge of the machine producing it and no head-start such as that the Poles had given them against Enigma.

Although the volume of intelligence derived from this system was much smaller than that from Enigma, its importance was often far higher because it produced primarily high-level, strategic intelligence that was sent between Wehrmacht High Command (OKW). The eventual bulk decryption of Lorenz-enciphered messages contributed significantly, and perhaps decisively, to the defeat of Nazi Germany.  Nevertheless, the Tunny story has become much less well known among the public than the Enigma one.  At Bletchley Park, some of the key people responsible for success in the Tunny effort included mathematicians W. T. "Bill" Tutte and Max Newman and electrical engineer Tommy Flowers.

Italian
In June 1940, the Italians were using book codes for most of their military messages, except for the Italian Navy, which in early 1941 had started using a version of the Hagelin rotor-based cipher machine C-38. This was broken from June 1941 onwards by the Italian subsection of GC&CS at Bletchley Park.

Japanese
In the Pacific theatre, a Japanese cipher machine, called "Purple" by the Americans, was used for highest-level Japanese diplomatic traffic. It produced a polyalphabetic substitution cipher, but unlike Enigma, was not a rotor machine, being built around electrical stepping switches. It was broken by the US Army Signal Intelligence Service and disseminated as Magic. Detailed reports by the Japanese ambassador to Germany were encrypted on the Purple machine. His reports included reviews of German assessments of the military situation, reviews of strategy and intentions, reports on direct inspections by the ambassador (in one case, of Normandy beach defences), and reports of long interviews with Hitler. The Japanese are said to have obtained an Enigma machine in 1937, although it is debated whether they were given it by the Germans or bought a commercial version, which, apart from the plugboard and internal wiring, was the German Heer/Luftwaffe machine. Having developed a similar machine, the Japanese did not use the Enigma machine for their most secret communications.

The chief fleet communications code system used by the Imperial Japanese Navy was called JN-25 by the Americans, and by early 1942 the US Navy had made considerable progress in decrypting Japanese naval messages. The US Army also made progress on the Japanese Army's codes in 1943, including codes used by supply ships, resulting in heavy losses to their shipping.

Distribution

Army- and Air Force-related intelligence derived from signals intelligence (SIGINT) sources—mainly Enigma decrypts in Hut 6—was compiled in summaries at GC&CS (Bletchley Park) Hut 3 and distributed initially under the codeword "BONIFACE", implying that it was acquired from a well placed agent in Berlin. The volume of the intelligence reports going out to commanders in the field built up gradually. 

Naval Enigma decrypted in Hut 8 was forwarded from Hut 4 to the Admiralty's Operational Intelligence Centre (OIC), which distributed it initially under the codeword "HYDRO". 

The codeword "ULTRA" was adopted in June 1941. This codeword was reportedly suggested by Commander Geoffrey Colpoys, RN, who served in the Royal Navy's OIC.

Army and Air Force
The distribution of Ultra information to Allied commanders and units in the field involved considerable risk of discovery by the Germans, and great care was taken to control both the information and knowledge of how it was obtained. Liaison officers were appointed for each field command to manage and control dissemination.

Dissemination of Ultra intelligence to field commanders was carried out by MI6, which operated Special Liaison Units (SLU) attached to major army and air force commands. The activity was organized and supervised on behalf of MI6 by Group Captain F. W. Winterbotham. Each SLU included intelligence, communications, and cryptographic elements. It was headed by a British Army or RAF officer, usually a major, known as "Special Liaison Officer". The main function of the liaison officer or his deputy was to pass Ultra intelligence bulletins to the commander of the command he was attached to, or to other indoctrinated staff officers. In order to safeguard Ultra, special precautions were taken. The standard procedure was for the liaison officer to present the intelligence summary to the recipient, stay with him while he studied it, then take it back and destroy it.

By the end of the war, there were about 40 SLUs serving commands around the world.  Fixed SLUs existed at the Admiralty, the War Office, the Air Ministry, RAF Fighter Command, the US Strategic Air Forces in Europe (Wycombe Abbey) and other fixed headquarters in the UK. An SLU was operating at the War HQ in Valletta, Malta. These units had permanent teleprinter links to Bletchley Park.

Mobile SLUs were attached to field army and air force headquarters and depended on radio communications to receive intelligence summaries. The first mobile SLUs appeared during the French campaign of 1940. An SLU supported the British Expeditionary Force (BEF) headed by General Lord Gort. The first liaison officers were Robert Gore-Browne and Humphrey Plowden. A second SLU of the 1940 period was attached to the RAF Advanced Air Striking Force at Meaux commanded by Air Vice-Marshal P H Lyon Playfair. This SLU was commanded by Squadron Leader F.W. "Tubby" Long.

Intelligence agencies
In 1940, special arrangements were made within the British intelligence services for handling BONIFACE and later Ultra intelligence. The Security Service started "Special Research Unit B1(b)" under Herbert Hart. In the SIS this intelligence was handled by "Section V" based at St Albans.

Radio and cryptography
The communications system was founded by Brigadier Sir Richard Gambier-Parry, who from 1938 to 1946 was head of MI6 Section VIII, based at Whaddon Hall in Buckinghamshire, UK. Ultra summaries from Bletchley Park were sent over landline to the Section VIII radio transmitter at Windy Ridge. From there they were transmitted to the destination SLUs.

The communications element of each SLU was called a "Special Communications Unit" or SCU. Radio transmitters were constructed at Whaddon Hall workshops, while receivers were the National HRO, made in the USA. The SCUs were highly mobile and the first such units used civilian Packard cars. The following SCUs are listed: SCU1 (Whaddon Hall), SCU2 (France before 1940, India), SCU3 (RSS Hanslope Park), SCU5, SCU6 (possibly Algiers and Italy), SCU7 (training unit in the UK), SCU8 (Europe after D-day), SCU9 (Europe after D-day), SCU11 (Palestine and India), SCU12 (India), SCU13 and SCU14.

The cryptographic element of each SLU was supplied by the RAF and was based on the TYPEX cryptographic machine and one-time pad systems.

RN Ultra messages from the OIC to ships at sea were necessarily transmitted over normal naval radio circuits and were protected by one-time pad encryption.

Lucy
An intriguing question concerns the alleged use of Ultra information by the "Lucy" spy ring, headquartered in Switzerland and apparently operated by one man, Rudolf Roessler. This was an extremely well informed, responsive ring that was able to get information "directly from German General Staff Headquarters" – often on specific request. It has been alleged that "Lucy" was in major part a conduit for the British to feed Ultra intelligence to the Soviets in a way that made it appear to have come from highly placed espionage rather than from cryptanalysis of German radio traffic. The Soviets, however, through an agent at Bletchley, John Cairncross, knew that Britain had broken Enigma. The "Lucy" ring was initially treated with suspicion by the Soviets. The information it provided was accurate and timely, however, and Soviet agents in Switzerland (including their chief, Alexander Radó) eventually learned to take it seriously. However, the theory that the Lucy ring was a cover for Britain to pass Enigma intelligence to the Soviets has not gained traction. Among others who have rejected the theory, Harry Hinsley, the official historian for the British Secret Services in World War II, stated that "there is no truth in the much-publicized claim that the British authorities made use of the ‘Lucy’ ring..to forward intelligence to Moscow".

Use of intelligence
Most deciphered messages, often about relative trivia, were insufficient as intelligence reports for military strategists or field commanders. The organisation, interpretation and distribution of decrypted Enigma message traffic and other sources into usable intelligence was a subtle task.

At Bletchley Park, extensive indices were kept of the information in the messages decrypted. For each message the traffic analysis recorded the radio frequency, the date and time of intercept, and the preamble—which contained the network-identifying discriminant, the time of origin of the message, the callsign of the originating and receiving stations, and the indicator setting. This allowed cross referencing of a new message with a previous one. The indices included message preambles, every person, every ship, every unit, every weapon, every technical term and of repeated phrases such as forms of address and other German military jargon that might be usable as cribs.

The first decryption of a wartime Enigma message, albeit one that had been transmitted three months earlier, was achieved by the Poles at PC Bruno on 17 January 1940. Little had been achieved by the start of the Allied campaign in Norway in April. At the start of the Battle of France on 10 May 1940, the Germans made a very significant change in the indicator procedures for Enigma messages. However, the Bletchley Park cryptanalysts had anticipated this, and were able — jointly with PC Bruno — to resume breaking messages from 22 May, although often with some delay. The intelligence that these messages yielded was of little operational use in the fast-moving situation of the German advance.

Decryption of Enigma traffic built up gradually during 1940, with the first two prototype bombes being delivered in March and August. The traffic was almost entirely limited to Luftwaffe messages. By the peak of the Battle of the Mediterranean in 1941, however, Bletchley Park was deciphering daily 2,000 Italian Hagelin messages. By the second half of 1941 30,000 Enigma messages a month were being deciphered, rising to 90,000 a month of Enigma and Fish decrypts combined later in the war.

Some of the contributions that Ultra intelligence made to the Allied successes are given below.

 In April 1940, Ultra information provided a detailed picture of the disposition of the German forces, and then their movement orders for the attack on the Low Countries prior to the Battle of France in May.
 An Ultra decrypt of June 1940 read KNICKEBEIN KLEVE IST AUF PUNKT 53 GRAD 24 MINUTEN NORD UND EIN GRAD WEST EINGERICHTET ("The Cleves Knickebein is directed at position 53 degrees 24 minutes north and 1 degree west"). This was the definitive piece of evidence that Dr R V Jones of scientific intelligence in the Air Ministry needed to show that the Germans were developing a radio guidance system for their bombers. Ultra intelligence then continued to play a vital role in the so-called Battle of the Beams.
 During the Battle of Britain, Air Chief Marshal Sir Hugh Dowding, Commander-in-Chief of RAF Fighter Command, had a teleprinter link from Bletchley Park to his headquarters at RAF Bentley Priory, for Ultra reports. Ultra intelligence kept him informed of German strategy, and of the strength and location of various Luftwaffe units, and often provided advance warning of bombing raids (but not of their specific targets). These contributed to the British success. Dowding was bitterly and sometimes unfairly criticized by others who did not see Ultra, but he did not disclose his source.
 Decryption of traffic from Luftwaffe radio networks provided a great deal of indirect intelligence about the Germans' planned Operation Sea Lion to invade England in 1940.
 On 17 September 1940 an Ultra message reported that equipment at German airfields in Belgium for loading planes with paratroops and their gear, was to be dismantled. This was taken as a clear signal that Sea Lion had been cancelled.
 Ultra revealed that a major German air raid was planned for the night of 14 November 1940, and indicated three possible targets, including London and Coventry. However, the specific target was not determined until late on the afternoon of 14 November, by detection of the German radio guidance signals. Unfortunately, countermeasures failed to prevent the devastating Coventry Blitz. F. W. Winterbotham claimed that Churchill had advance warning, but intentionally did nothing about the raid, to safeguard Ultra. This claim has been comprehensively refuted by R V Jones, Sir David Hunt, Ralph Bennett and Peter Calvocoressi. Ultra warned of a raid but did not reveal the target. Churchill, who had been en route to Ditchley Park, was told that London might be bombed and returned to 10 Downing Street so that he could observe the raid from the Air Ministry roof.
 Ultra intelligence considerably aided the British Army's Operation Compass victory over the much larger Italian army in Libya in December 1940 – February 1941.
 Ultra intelligence greatly aided the Royal Navy's victory over the Italian navy in the Battle of Cape Matapan in March 1941.
 Although the Allies lost the Battle of Crete in May 1941, the Ultra intelligence that a parachute landing was planned, and the exact day of the invasion, meant that heavy losses were inflicted on the Germans and that fewer British troops were captured.
 Ultra intelligence fully revealed the preparations for Operation Barbarossa, the German invasion of the USSR. Although this information was passed to the Soviet government,  Stalin refused to believe it. The information did, however, help British planning, knowing that substantial German forces were to be deployed to the East.
 Ultra intelligence made a very significant contribution in the Battle of the Atlantic. Winston Churchill wrote "The only thing that ever really frightened me during the war was the U-boat peril." The decryption of Enigma signals to the U-boats was much more difficult than those of the Luftwaffe. It was not until June 1941 that Bletchley Park was able to read a significant amount of this traffic currently. Transatlantic convoys were then diverted away from the U-boat "wolfpacks", and the U-boat supply vessels were sunk. On 1 February 1942, Enigma U-boat traffic became unreadable because of the introduction of a different 4-rotor Enigma machine. This situation persisted until December 1942, although other German naval Enigma messages were still being deciphered, such as those of the U-boat training command at Kiel. From December 1942 to the end of the war, Ultra allowed Allied convoys to evade U-boat patrol lines, and guided Allied anti-submarine forces to the location of U-boats at sea.
 In the Western Desert Campaign, Ultra intelligence helped Wavell and Auchinleck to prevent Rommel's forces from reaching Cairo in the autumn of 1941.
 Ultra intelligence from Hagelin decrypts, and from Luftwaffe and German naval Enigma decrypts, helped sink about half of the ships supplying the Axis forces in North Africa.
 Ultra intelligence from Abwehr transmissions confirmed that Britain's Security Service (MI5) had captured all of the German agents in Britain, and that the Abwehr still believed in the many double agents which MI5 controlled under the Double Cross System. This enabled major deception operations.
 Deciphered JN-25 messages allowed the U.S. to turn back a Japanese offensive in the Battle of the Coral Sea in April 1942 and set up the decisive American victory at the Battle of Midway in June 1942.
 Ultra contributed very significantly to the monitoring of German developments at Peenemünde and the collection of V-1 and V-2 Intelligence from 1942 onwards.
 Ultra contributed to Montgomery's victory at the Battle of Alam el Halfa by providing warning of Rommel's planned attack.
 Ultra also contributed to the success of Montgomery's offensive in the Second Battle of El Alamein, by providing him (before the battle) with a complete picture of Axis forces, and (during the battle) with Rommel's own action reports to Germany.
 Ultra provided evidence that the Allied landings in French North Africa (Operation Torch) were not anticipated.
 A JN-25 decrypt of 14 April 1943 provided details of Admiral Yamamoto's forthcoming visit to Balalae Island, and on 18 April, a year to the day following the Doolittle Raid, his aircraft was shot down, killing this man who was regarded as irreplaceable.
 Ship position reports in the Japanese Army’s "2468" water transport code, decrypted by the SIS starting in July 1943, helped U.S. submarines and aircraft sink two-thirds of the Japanese merchant marine.
 The part played by Ultra intelligence in the preparation for the Allied invasion of Sicily was of unprecedented importance. It provided information as to where the enemy's forces were strongest and that the elaborate strategic deceptions had convinced Hitler and the German high command.
 The success of the Battle of North Cape, in which HMS Duke of York sank the German battleship Scharnhorst, was entirely built on prompt deciphering of German naval signals. 
 US Army Lieutenant Arthur J Levenson who worked on both Enigma and Tunny at Bletchley Park, said in a 1980 interview of intelligence from Tunny 
 Both Enigma and Tunny decrypts showed Germany had been taken in by Operation Bodyguard, the deception operation to protect Operation Overlord. They revealed the Germans did not anticipate the Normandy landings and even after D-Day still believed  Normandy was only a feint, with the main invasion to be in the Pas de Calais.
 Information that there was German Panzergrenadier division in the planned dropping zone for the US 101st Airborne Division in Operation Overlord led to a change of location.
 It assisted greatly in Operation Cobra.
 It warned of the major German counterattack at Mortain, and allowed the Allies to surround the forces at Falaise.
 During the Allied advance to Germany, Ultra often provided detailed tactical information, and showed how Hitler ignored the advice of his generals and insisted on German troops fighting in place "to the last man".
 Arthur "Bomber" Harris, officer commanding RAF Bomber Command, was not cleared for Ultra. After D-Day, with the resumption of the strategic bomber campaign over Germany, Harris remained wedded to area bombardment. Historian Frederick Taylor argues that, as Harris was not cleared for access to Ultra, he was given some information gleaned from Enigma but not the information's source. This affected his attitude about post-D-Day directives to target oil installations, since he did not know that senior Allied commanders were using high-level German sources to assess just how much this was hurting the German war effort; thus Harris tended to see the directives to bomb specific oil and munitions targets as a "panacea" (his word) and a distraction from the real task of making the rubble bounce.

Safeguarding of sources
The Allies were seriously concerned with the prospect of the Axis command finding out that they had broken into the Enigma traffic. The British were more disciplined about such measures than the Americans, and this difference was a source of friction between them. 

To disguise the source of the intelligence for the Allied attacks on Axis supply ships bound for North Africa, "spotter" submarines and aircraft were sent to search for Axis ships. These searchers or their radio transmissions were observed by the Axis forces, who concluded their ships were being found by conventional reconnaissance. They suspected that there were some 400 Allied submarines in the Mediterranean and a huge fleet of reconnaissance aircraft on Malta. In fact, there were only 25 submarines and at times as few as three aircraft.

This procedure also helped conceal the intelligence source from Allied personnel, who might give away the secret by careless talk, or under interrogation if captured. Along with the search mission that would find the Axis ships, two or three additional search missions would be sent out to other areas, so that crews would not begin to wonder why a single mission found the Axis ships every time.

Other deceptive means were used. On one occasion, a convoy of five ships sailed from Naples to North Africa with essential supplies at a critical moment in the North African fighting. There was no time to have the ships properly spotted beforehand. The decision to attack solely on Ultra intelligence went directly to Churchill. The ships were all sunk by an attack "out of the blue", arousing German suspicions of a security breach. To distract the Germans from the idea of a signals breach (such as Ultra), the Allies sent a radio message to a fictitious spy in Naples, congratulating him for this success. According to some sources the Germans decrypted this message and believed it.

In the Battle of the Atlantic,  the precautions were taken to the extreme. In most cases where the Allies knew from intercepts the location of a U-boat in mid-Atlantic, the U-boat was not attacked immediately, until a "cover story" could be arranged. For example, a search plane might be "fortunate enough" to sight the U-boat, thus explaining the Allied attack.

Some Germans had suspicions that all was not right with Enigma. Admiral Karl Dönitz received reports of "impossible" encounters between U-boats and enemy vessels which made him suspect some compromise of his communications. In one instance, three U-boats met at a tiny island in the Caribbean Sea, and a British destroyer promptly showed up. The U-boats escaped and reported what had happened. Dönitz immediately asked for a review of Enigma's security. The analysis suggested that the signals problem, if there was one, was not due to the Enigma itself. Dönitz had the settings book changed anyway, blacking out Bletchley Park for a period. However, the evidence was never enough to truly convince him that Naval Enigma was being read by the Allies. The more so, since B-Dienst, his own codebreaking group, had partially broken Royal Navy traffic (including its convoy codes early in the war), and supplied enough information to support the idea that the Allies were unable to read Naval Enigma.

By 1945, most German Enigma traffic could be decrypted within a day or two, yet the Germans remained confident of its security.

Role of women in Allied codebreaking

After encryption systems were "broken", there was a large volume of cryptologic work needed to recover daily key settings and keep up with changes in enemy security procedures, plus the more mundane work of processing, translating, indexing, analyzing and distributing tens of thousands of intercepted messages daily. The more successful the code breakers were, the more labor was required. Some 8,000 women worked at Bletchley Park, about three quarters of the work force. Before the attack on Pearl Harbor, the US Navy sent letters to top women's colleges seeking introductions to their best seniors; the Army soon followed suit. By the end of the war, some 7000 workers in the Army Signal Intelligence service, out of a total 10,500, were female. By contrast, the Germans and Japanese had strong ideological objections to women engaging in war work. The Nazis even created a Cross of Honour of the German Mother to encourage women to stay at home and have babies.

Effect on the war
The exact influence of Ultra on the course of the war is debated; an oft-repeated assessment is that decryption of German ciphers advanced the end of the European war by no less than two years. Hinsley, who first made this claim, is typically cited as an authority for the two-year estimate.

Winterbotham's quoting of Eisenhower's "decisive" verdict is part of a letter sent by Eisenhower to Menzies after the conclusion of the European war and later found among his papers at the Eisenhower Presidential Library. It allows a contemporary, documentary view of a leader on Ultra's importance:

There is wide disagreement about the importance of codebreaking in winning the crucial Battle of the Atlantic. To cite just one example, the historian Max Hastings states that "In 1941 alone, Ultra saved between 1.5 and two million tons of Allied ships from destruction." This would represent a 40 percent to 53 percent reduction, though it is not clear how this extrapolation was made.

Another view is from a history based on the German naval archives written after the war for the British Admiralty by a former U-boat commander and son-in-law of his commander, Grand Admiral Karl Dönitz. His book reports that several times during the war they undertook detailed investigations to see whether their operations were being compromised by broken Enigma ciphers. These investigations were spurred because the Germans had broken the British naval code and found the information useful. Their investigations were negative, and the conclusion was that their defeat "was due firstly to outstanding developments in enemy radar..." The great advance was centimetric radar, developed in a joint British-American venture, which became operational in the spring of 1943. Earlier radar was unable to distinguish U-boat conning towers from the surface of the sea, so it could not even locate U-boats attacking convoys on the surface on moonless nights; thus the surfaced U-boats were almost invisible, while having the additional advantage of being swifter than their prey. The new higher-frequency radar could spot conning towers, and periscopes could even be detected from airplanes. Some idea of the relative effect of cipher-breaking and radar improvement can be obtained from graphs showing the tonnage of merchantmen sunk and the number of U-boats sunk in each month of the Battle of the Atlantic. The graphs cannot be interpreted unambiguously, because it is challenging to factor in many variables such as improvements in cipher-breaking and the numerous other advances in equipment and techniques used to combat U-boats. Nonetheless, the data seem to favor the view of the former U-boat commander—that radar was crucial.

While Ultra certainly affected the course of the Western Front during the war, two factors often argued against Ultra having shortened the overall war by a measure of years are the relatively small role it played in the Eastern Front conflict between Germany and the Soviet Union, and the completely independent development of the U.S.-led Manhattan Project to create the atomic bomb.  Author Jeffrey T. Richelson mentions Hinsley's estimate of at least two years, and concludes that "It might be more accurate to say that Ultra helped shorten the war by three months – the interval between the actual end of the war in Europe and the time the United States would have been able to drop an atomic bomb on Hamburg or Berlin – and might have shortened the war by as much as two years had the U.S. atomic bomb program been unsuccessful."  Military historian Guy Hartcup analyzes aspects of the question but then simply says, "It is impossible to calculate in terms of months or years how much Ultra shortened the war."

Postwar suppression
While it is obvious why Britain and the U.S. went to considerable pains to keep Ultra a secret until the end of the war, it has been a matter of some conjecture why Ultra was kept officially secret for 29 years thereafter, until 1974. During that period, the important contributions to the war effort of a great many people remained unknown, and they were unable to share in the glory of what is now recognised as one of the chief reasons the Allies won the war – or, at least, as quickly as they did.

At least three versions exist as to why Ultra was kept secret so long. Each has plausibility, and all may be true. First, as David Kahn pointed out in his 1974 New York Times review of Winterbotham's The Ultra Secret, after the war, surplus Enigmas and Enigma-like machines were sold to Third World countries, which remained convinced of the security of the remarkable cipher machines. Their traffic was not as secure as they believed, however, which is one reason the British made the machines available.

By the 1970s, newer computer-based ciphers were becoming popular as the world increasingly turned to computerised communications, and the usefulness of Enigma copies (and rotor machines generally) rapidly decreased. Switzerland developed its own version of Enigma, known as NEMA, and used it into the late 1970s, while the United States National Security Agency (NSA) retired the last of its rotor-based encryption systems, the KL-7 series, in the 1980s.

A second explanation relates to a misadventure of Churchill's between the World Wars, when he publicly disclosed information from decrypted Soviet communications. This had prompted the Soviets to change their ciphers, leading to a blackout.

The third explanation is given by Winterbotham, who recounts that two weeks after V-E Day, on 25 May 1945, Churchill requested former recipients of Ultra intelligence not to divulge the source or the information that they had received from it, in order that there be neither damage to the future operations of the Secret Service nor any cause for the Axis to blame Ultra for their defeat.

Since it was British and, later, American message-breaking which had been the most extensive, the importance of Enigma decrypts to the prosecution of the war remained unknown despite revelations by the Poles and the French of their early work on breaking the Enigma cipher. This work, which was carried out in the 1930s and continued into the early part of the war, was necessarily uninformed regarding further breakthroughs achieved by the Allies during the balance of the war.

Postwar disclosures
In 1967, Polish military historian Władysław Kozaczuk in his book Bitwa o tajemnice ("Battle for Secrets") first revealed Enigma had been broken by Polish cryptologists before World War II. 

Ladislas Farago's 1971 best-seller The Game of the Foxes gave an early garbled version of the myth of the purloined Enigma. According to Farago, it was thanks to a "Polish-Swedish ring [that] the British obtained a working model of the 'Enigma' machine, which the Germans used to encipher their top-secret messages." "It was to pick up one of these machines that Commander Denniston went clandestinely to a secluded Polish castle [!] on the eve of the war. Dilly Knox later solved its keying, exposing all Abwehr signals encoded by this system." "In 1941 [t]he brilliant cryptologist Dillwyn Knox, working at the Government Code & Cypher School at the Bletchley centre of British code-cracking, solved the keying of the Abwehr's Enigma machine."

Later, the 1973 public disclosure of Enigma decryption in the book Enigma by French intelligence officer Gustave Bertrand generated pressure to discuss the rest of the Enigma–Ultra story.

The British ban was finally lifted in 1974, the year that a key participant on the distribution side of the Ultra project, F. W. Winterbotham, published The Ultra Secret. 

A succession of books by former participants and others followed. The official history of British intelligence in World War II was published in five volumes from 1979 to 1988, and included further details from official sources concerning the availability and employment of Ultra intelligence. It was chiefly edited by Harry Hinsley, with one volume by Michael Howard. There is also a one-volume collection of reminiscences by Ultra veterans, Codebreakers (1993), edited by Hinsley and Alan Stripp.

A 2012 London Science Museum exhibit, "Code Breaker:  Alan Turing's Life and Legacy", marking the centenary of his birth, includes a short film of statements by half a dozen participants and historians of the World War II Bletchley Park Ultra operations. John Agar, a historian of science and technology, states that by war's end 8,995 people worked at Bletchley Park. Iain Standen, Chief Executive of the Bletchley Park Trust, says of the work done there:  "It was crucial to the survival of Britain, and indeed of the West."  The Departmental Historian at GCHQ (the Government Communications Headquarters), who identifies himself only as "Tony" but seems to speak authoritatively, says that Ultra was a "major force multiplier. It was the first time that quantities of real-time intelligence became available to the British military."  He further states that it is only in 2012 that Alan Turing's last two papers on Enigma decryption have been released to Britain's National Archives; the seven decades' delay had been due to their "continuing sensitivity... It wouldn't have been safe to release [them earlier]."

Holocaust intelligence
Historians and Holocaust researchers have tried to establish when the Allies realized the full extent of Nazi-era extermination of Jews, and specifically, the extermination-camp system. In 1999, the U.S. Government passed the Nazi War Crimes Disclosure Act (P.L. 105-246), making it policy to declassify all Nazi war crime documents in their files; this was later amended to include the Japanese Imperial Government. As a result, more than 600 decrypts and translations of intercepted messages were disclosed; NSA historian Robert Hanyok would conclude that Allied communications intelligence, "by itself, could not have provided an early warning to Allied leaders regarding the nature and scope of the Holocaust."

Following Operation Barbarossa, decrypts in August 1941 alerted British authorities to the many massacres in occupied zones of the Soviet Union, including those of Jews, but specifics were not made public for security reasons.  Revelations about the concentration camps were gleaned from other sources, and were publicly reported by the Polish government-in-exile, Jan Karski and the WJC offices in Switzerland a year or more later. A decrypted message referring to "Einsatz Reinhard" (the Höfle Telegram), from January 11, 1943, may have outlined the system and listed the number of Jews and others gassed at four death camps the previous year, but codebreakers did not understand the meaning of the message. In summer 1944, Arthur Schlesinger, an OSS analyst, interpreted the intelligence as an "incremental increase in persecution rather than... extermination."

Postwar consequences
There has been controversy about the influence of Allied Enigma decryption on the course of World War II. It has also been suggested that the question should be broadened to include Ultra's influence not only on the war itself, but also on the post-war period.

F. W. Winterbotham, the first author to outline the influence of Enigma decryption on the course of World War II, likewise made the earliest contribution to an appreciation of Ultra's postwar influence, which now continues into the 21st century—and not only in the postwar establishment of Britain's GCHQ (Government Communication Headquarters) and America's NSA. "Let no one be fooled," Winterbotham admonishes in chapter 3, "by the spate of television films and propaganda which has made the war seem like some great triumphant epic. It was, in fact, a very narrow shave, and the reader may like to ponder [...] whether [...] we might have won [without] Ultra."

Debate continues on whether, had postwar political and military leaders been aware of Ultra's role in Allied victory in World War II, these leaders might have been less optimistic about post-World War II military involvements.

Knightley suggests that Ultra may have contributed to the development of the Cold War. The Soviets received disguised Ultra information, but the existence of Ultra itself was not disclosed by the western Allies. The Soviets, who had clues to Ultra's existence, possibly through Kim Philby, John Cairncross and Anthony Blunt, may thus have felt still more distrustful of their wartime partners.

In 1953, the CIA's Project ARTICHOKE, a series of experiments on human subjects to develop drugs for use in interrogations, was renamed Project MKUltra. MK was the CIA's designation for its Technical Services Division and Ultra was in reference to the Ultra project.

See also
 Hut 6
 Hut 8
 Magic (cryptography)
 Military intelligence
 Signals intelligence in modern history
 The Imitation Game

Notes

References

Bibliography

 
 
 
 
  A short account of World War II cryptology which covers more than just the Enigma story.
 
 
 
 
 
 
 
  Has been criticised for inaccuracy and exaggeration
  
 
 
 
 
 
 
  Transcript of a lecture given on Tuesday 19 October 1993 at Cambridge University
 
 
 
 
 
 
  This is the standard reference on the crucial foundations laid by the Poles for World War II Enigma decryption.
  Focuses on the battle-field exploitation of Ultra material.
 

 
 Rejewski, Marian, wrote a number of papers on his 1932 break into Enigma and his subsequent work on the cipher, well into World War II, with his fellow mathematician-cryptologists, Jerzy Różycki and Henryk Zygalski. Most of Rejewski's papers appear in 
 
 
 
  This provides a description of the Enigma, other ciphers, and codes.
 
 
 
 
  An early publication containing several misapprehensions that are corrected in an addendum in the 1997 edition.
 
 
  The first published account of the previously secret wartime operation, concentrating  mainly on distribution of intelligence. It was written from memory and has been shown by subsequent authors, who had access to official records, to contain some inaccuracies.

Telecommunications-related introductions in 1941
1941 establishments in the United Kingdom
Military intelligence
Signals intelligence of World War II
Secret Intelligence Service
Bletchley Park